Solange Lackington Gangas (Santiago de Chile, December 7, 1962) is a Chilean actress, director and playwright of film, theater and television. She studied theater at the School of Theater of the Pontifical Catholic University of Chile. At just 20 years old, she made her debut on television, acting in telenovelas such as La torre 10 (1984) and Bellas y audaces (1988), alongside figures such as Sonia Viveros, Lucy Salgado and Luis Alarcón. During this period, she collaborated with the producer Sonia Fuchs in the Dramatic Area of Televisión Nacional de Chile. She achieved great popularity by playing Estrellita on the daily series Los Venegas. However, her consecration was due to her joining the Dramatic Area of Channel 13, acting in telenovelas such as Sabor a ti, Piel canela, Machos and Brujas. In this period, she achieved a season of great awards for her work, including Apes Awards and Altazor Awards. In 2017, she assumed the title role in Edward Franklin Albee's play Who's Afraid of Virginia Woolf ?. Her performance in this play earned her positive reviews. A year later, she played Gabriela Mistral in Andrés Kalawski's Mistral, Gabriela, 1945.

Filmography

Films 

Súper, todo Chile adentro (2009) – Nora
Against the devil (2019)
 The man of the future (2019)
Nobody Knows I'm Here (2020)

Telenovelas

References

1962 births
Actresses from Santiago
Chilean film actresses
Chilean stage actresses
Chilean telenovela actresses
Chilean television actresses
Living people
Pontifical Catholic University of Chile alumni